Margarita Nelken (5 July 1894– 5 March 1968) was a Spanish feminist and writer. She was a well known intellectual and a central figure in the earliest Spanish women's movement in the 1930s.

Early life and education
Nelken was born María Teresa Lea Nelken y Mansberger in Madrid in 1894. Her parents were of German-Jewish origin and owners of a jewellery store. She studied music, painting and languages, and she learned to speak French, German and English besides her native Spanish. Her sister, Carmen Eva Nelken, was an actress and writer.

Career and views
Nelken wrote books of fiction with a socio-political orientation in the 1920s, including La trampa del arenal (The sand trap, 1923). Her other works include La condición social de la mujer en España (The social condition of women in Spain, 1922) and La mujer ante las cortes constituyentes (1931). She also wrote books about Spanish women writers and Spanish women politicians as well as short stories. She held militant perspective of feminism, claiming that exploitation of women workers had negative effects on both male workers and women.

Political career
In 1931, she became a member of  the Spanish Socialist Workers' Party (PSOE) and ran for office in the partial elections in October 1931 as a candidate for the Agrupación Socialista in Badajoz. She was elected to the Constitutive Parliament. She also achieved a position in the Parliament in the elections of November 1933 and February 1936. Although she was a feminist, she rejected the Spanish women's right to vote, arguing that they were not ready for it. A fervent advocate of the Agrarian Reform, she was the victim of the attacks from the right because her ethnicity and her feminist background. After the Asturian Revolution of 1934, she was accused of military rebellion and left Spain. While in exile, she lived in Paris and visited Scandinavia and the Soviet Union, raising funds for the victims of the repression. She returned to Spain in 1936. After the beginning of the Spanish Civil War, she remained in Madrid, organizing the transfer of the artistic treasures of Toledo to the vault of the Bank of Spain in order to protect them and giving radio speeches in order to rise the morale of the militiamen. Then, disappointed by the leadership of Largo Caballero, she left the PSOE and joined the Communist Party (PCE).

Exile and death
She served at the parliament until 1939, and as a Republican and socialist, she and her sister exiled to Mexico at the end of the Spanish civil war. There she worked as an art critic. She also wrote a book entitled Los judíos en la cultura hispánica in Mexico, which was republished by AHebraica in Spain in 2009. Nelken died in Mexico on 9 March 1968.

References

Bibliography
 

1894 births
1968 deaths
People from Madrid
Spanish people of German-Jewish descent
Spanish Socialist Workers' Party politicians
Communist Party of Spain politicians
Members of the Congress of Deputies of the Second Spanish Republic
Spanish women's rights activists
Spanish feminists
20th-century Spanish women writers
Spanish art critics
Spanish women of the Spanish Civil War (Republican faction)
Exiles of the Spanish Civil War in Mexico
Women in the Spanish Civil War
Spanish women art critics
Spanish socialist feminists
Exiled Spanish politicians
20th-century Spanish women politicians